This is a list of Belgian television related events from 1989.

Events
1 February – The Dutch-language television station VTM officially starts its regular broadcasting service in Vilvoorde, Flemish Brabant. 
18 March - Ingeborg is selected to represent Belgium at the 1989 Eurovision Song Contest with her song "Door de wind". She is selected to be the thirty-fourth Belgian Eurovision entry during Eurosong held at the Amerikaans Theater in Brussels.
Unknown - Debut of VTM Soundmixshow, a series hosted by Bart Kaëll in which members of the public impersonate their favourite singers.
Unknown - The first season of VTM Soundmixshow was won by Wim Peelman performing as Scott Walker.

Debuts
Unknown - VTM Soundmixshow (1989-1995, 1997-2000)

Television shows

1980s
Tik Tak (1981-1991)

Ending this year

Births

Deaths

References